Henchir-Belli also known as Beled Belli is a location and archaeological site in Tunisia.

History 
Known as Belali  it was a Roman-era civitas in the Roman province of  Africa Proconsularis. Column ruins of an ancient temple/church are still found in situ.

The ancient city was also the seat of an ancient bishopric, in the ecclesiastical province of Carthage. The only known bishop from antiquity is Adeodato (fl.411).  The bishopric survives today as a titular see of the Roman Catholic Church, Carlos Alberto de Pinho Moreira Azevedo being bishop since 2004.

References

Archaeological sites in Tunisia
Roman towns and cities in Tunisia
Populated places in Tunisia
Catholic titular sees in Africa